Bebearia phantasiella, the fantasiella, is a butterfly in the family Nymphalidae. It is found in Nigeria, Cameroon, Uganda and Tanzania. The habitat consists of forests.

Subspecies
Bebearia phantasiella phantasiella (Nigeria, Cameroon)
Bebearia phantasiella simulata (van Someren, 1939) (Uganda, Tanzania: western shores of Lake Victoria)

References

Butterflies described in 1891
phantasiella
Butterflies of Africa